Antanandava is a rural commune in Madagascar. It belongs to the district of Moramanga, which is a part of Alaotra-Mangoro Region. The population of the commune was 12,755 in 2018.

Primary and junior level secondary education are available in town. The majority 99% of the population of the commune are farmers.  The most important crops are rice and beans, while other important agricultural products are sugarcane and bambara groundnut.  Services provide employment for 1% of the population.

References

Populated places in Alaotra-Mangoro